Ken Chapman is the name of:

Ken Chapman (footballer, born 1932), English footballer
Ken Chapman (footballer, born 1948), English footballer